La Tahzan is a 2013 Indonesian drama film which directed by Danial Rifki and released on August 2, 2013, by Falcon Pictures. This film starred by Atiqah Hasiholan, Ario Bayu, Joe Taslim, and Prilly Latuconsina. The film was nominated for "Movie of the Year" at the 2013 Yahoo! OMG Awards and nominated for "Favorite Film" at the 8th Annual Indonesian Movie Awards.

Cast
Atiqah Hasiholan as Viona
Ario Bayu as Hasan
Joe Taslim as Yamada
Prilly Latuconsina as Neneng

Filming process
This film is filmed location in Indonesia and Japan to take only 15 days. Most of the set is done in Japan: Wakayama, Kobe, Osaka, and Kyoto. Before using the title La Tahzan, at first the film will use title Orenji (Japanese language: オレンジ).

Soundtrack
This film also fills the original soundtrack: "Bidadari Surga" and "Amanah Cinta" (Uje' two singles), "I Love You" from Ammir, and "Jangan Bersedih (La Tahzan)" from Merpati Band.

Awards and nominations

References

External links
 

2013 films
Films set in Japan
Indonesian drama films
Films shot in Japan
Japan in non-Japanese culture
2013 drama films
2010s Indonesian-language films